Pazar (also Romanized as Pāzar; also known as Pārz and Porzar) is a village in Aqda Rural District, Aqda District, Ardakan County, Yazd Province, Iran. At the 2006 census, its population was 54, in 21 families.

References 

Populated places in Ardakan County